Marco Júlio Castanheira Afonso Alves Ferreira (born 12 March 1978) is a Portuguese former professional footballer who played as a winger.

He amassed Primeira Liga totals of 127 games and 15 goals over the course of eight seasons, representing mainly in the competition Vitória de Setúbal and Porto. He also played professionally in Spain, Japan, England and Greece.

Club career
Primarily known for his speed, Ferreira was born in Vimioso in the Bragança District, and started his career at F.C. Tirsense in the second division. In 1998 he moved to Atlético Madrid B, but only lasted a few months in Spain, finishing the season at Yokohama Flügels in the J1 League.

Ferreira would go on to represent F.C. Paços de Ferreira – also in his country's second level – where he was a key player, spending the following three-and-a-half seasons at Primeira Liga club Vitória de Setúbal. In January 2003 he joined FC Porto, being part of the José Mourinho-led squad that defeated Celtic in the 2002–03 UEFA Cup final, coming on as a substitute for Capucho in the 98th minute. He also featured in several UEFA Champions League matches in the following campaign, but was not selected for the team that won the decisive match, and also added two consecutive league championships during his time with the northerners, wearing jersey No. 78 due to his birthyear.

After that, Ferreira was loaned to Vitória de Guimarães for 2004–05. In the following year he made the same move, now to F.C. Penafiel, but was released in January 2006 and promptly signed with S.L. Benfica, until June 2009; while in Lisbon he was unable to establish himself as a first-team player, and was placed on the transfer list.

On 31 August 2007, Ferreira joined English side Leicester City on loan until the end of the year, but his contract was terminated in December after becoming unsettled in the country, making no senior appearances for the club(he was an unused substitute in a 3–2 League Cup win over Nottingham Forest on 18 September). Subsequently, he finished the campaign with C.F. Os Belenenses, also appearing very rarely.

In August 2008, Ferreira signed with modest Ethnikos Piraeus FC. He spent 18 months at the Greek second division team, being released and retiring at the age of 32.

International career
Ferreira's debut for Portugal came in a friendly with Tunisia on 12 October 2002, playing six minutes after taking the place of Luís Figo. He went on to earn a further two caps during that year.

Honours
Porto
Primeira Liga: 2002–03, 2003–04
Taça de Portugal: 2002–03
Supertaça Cândido de Oliveira: 2003
UEFA Champions League: 2003–04
UEFA Cup: 2002–03

References

External links

1978 births
Living people
Portuguese footballers
Association football wingers
Primeira Liga players
Liga Portugal 2 players
F.C. Tirsense players
F.C. Paços de Ferreira players
Vitória F.C. players
FC Porto players
UEFA Champions League winning players
UEFA Cup winning players
Vitória S.C. players
F.C. Penafiel players
S.L. Benfica footballers
C.F. Os Belenenses players
Segunda División players
Atlético Madrid B players
J1 League players
Yokohama Flügels players
Leicester City F.C. players
Football League (Greece) players
Ethnikos Piraeus F.C. players
Portugal international footballers
Portuguese expatriate footballers
Expatriate footballers in Spain
Expatriate footballers in Japan
Expatriate footballers in England
Expatriate footballers in Greece
Portuguese expatriate sportspeople in Japan
Portuguese expatriate sportspeople in Greece
Sportspeople from Bragança District